NA-73 Wazirabad is a constituency for the National Assembly of Pakistan. It is made up of the Wazirabad District.

Members of Parliament

1970-1977: NW-72 Gujranwala-III

1977-1988: NA-98 Gujranwala-I

1988-2002: NA-74 Gujranwala-I

2002-2018: NA-101 Gujranwala-VII

2018-2022: NA-79 Gujranwala-I

Election 2002 

General elections were held on 10 Oct 2002. Hamid Nasir Chattha of PML-J won by 69,171 votes.

Election 2008 

General elections were held on 18 Feb 2008. Justice (R) Iftikhar Ahmad Cheema of PML-N won by 71,792 votes.

Election 2013 

General elections were held on 11 May 2013. Justice (R) Iftikhar Ahmed Cheema of PML-N won by 99,924 votes and became the  member of National Assembly.

By-election 2016 
A by-election was held on 22 March 2016 in which Iftikhar Ahmed Cheema of PML (N) won the seat. He secured 82,420 votes defeating his rival Muhammad Ahmed Chattha of Pakistan Tehreek-e-Insaf

Election 2018 
General elections were held on 25 July 2018.

See also
NA-72 Narowal-II
NA-74 Gujranwala-I

References

External links
 Election result's official website

NA-101